Nuisance is the debut studio album by British rock band Menswear, released on 24 October 1995 by Laurel. The album was preceded by "I'll Manage Somehow", "Daydreamer" and "Stardust"; the former charted in the top 40 while the latter two charted in the top 20. The album peaked at number 11 on the UK album chart.

Production
All the material for Nuisance was written by Johnny Dean, Chris Gentry, Simon White, Matt Everitt and Stuart Black. The album was produced by Neill King.

Release
Preceding the album, "I'll Manage Somehow" peaked at number 49 in the UK. This was followed up by "Daydreamer" and ""Stardust", charting at number 14 and number 16 respectively. Nuisance was released on 24 October 1995 by label Laurel and peaked at number 11 on the UK album chart. "Sleeping In" reached number 24 and "Being Brave" charted at number 10.

Reception

In 1999, Ned Raggett ranked the album at number 35 on his list of "The Top 136 or So Albums of the Nineties". In a retrospective article about Britpop, Huffington Post writer Kayley Kravitz wrote that while Nuisance "stands up as a great Britpop record" it sound "[d]ated [...] but essential Britpop nonetheless."

Track listing
All songs written by Johnny Dean, Chris Gentry, Simon White, Matt Everitt and Stuart Black.

"125 West 3rd Street" – 3:06
"I'll Manage Somehow" – 2:35
"Sleeping In" – 4:42
"Little Miss Pinpoint Eyes" – 2:07
"Daydreamer" – 2:16
"Hollywood Girl" – 2:18
"Being Brave" – 4:02
"Around You Again" – 3:23
"The One" – 3:43
"Stardust" – 2:55
"Piece of Me" – 3:03
"Stardust (reprise)" – 14:39
Includes hidden track "Bones and Red Meat", which lasts for 3:20

Personnel
Johnny Dean – vocals
Chris Gentry – guitar
Simon White – guitar
Stuart Black – bass
Matt Everitt – drums

References
 Footnotes

 Citations

External links

Nuisance at YouTube (streamed copy where licensed)

1995 debut albums
Menswear (band) albums